Eevald Äärma (until 1936 Ärman; 28 December 1911 – 13 October 2005) was an Estonian pole vaulter. He competed at the 1934 European Championships and 1936 Summer Olympics and placed 7th and 26th, respectively.

Äärma was born in Tallinn, Estonia. He studied veterinary medicine at the University of Tartu (1937–1939) and then at the University of Helsinki. He took up pole vaulting in 1927 and won the Estonian title in 1936 and 1937. In 1944, when the Soviet Army entered Estonia, he fled to Sweden. He emigrated to the United States in 1955 and settled in Aplington, Iowa, where he worked as a veterinary doctor. In 1968 he moved to Baltimore.

References

1911 births
2005 deaths
Sportspeople from Tallinn
People from the Governorate of Livonia
Athletes (track and field) at the 1936 Summer Olympics
Olympic athletes of Estonia
Estonian male pole vaulters
Estonian World War II refugees
Estonian emigrants to the United States
University of Tartu alumni
University of Helsinki alumni